Anders Primdahl Vistisen (born 12 November 1987) is a Danish politician and Member of the European Parliament (MEP) from Denmark. He is a member of the Danish People's Party, part of the European Conservatives and Reformists.

He was the national chairman of the youth section of the party in the period 2012-2015. In 2014 he was elected as member of the European Parliament for Denmark as a representative for European Conservatives and Reformists.

On 1 March 2018 Vistisen was one of three Danish MEPs who voted against a motion to encourage national parliaments to ban "gay conversion therapies".

In 2019 European Parliament election the Danish People's Party lost more than half of their votes and two of their three seats.  So Vistisen, one of Matteo Salvini's key allies, lost his seat as an MEP in July 2019.

On 23 November 2022 he became member of the parliament once again.

References

1987 births
Living people
People from Viborg Municipality
Danish People's Party politicians
Danish People's Party MEPs
MEPs for Denmark 2014–2019
MEPs for Denmark 2019–2024
European Conservatives and Reformists MEPs